Joshua Fry Speed (November 14, 1814  May 29, 1882) was an American politician who was a close friend of future President Abraham Lincoln from his days in Springfield, Illinois, where Speed was a partner in a general store. Later, Speed was a farmer and a real estate investor in Kentucky, and also served one term in the Kentucky House of Representatives in 1848.

Life

Ancestors, family and early life
Joshua Fry Speed was born at Farmington, Louisville, Kentucky, to Judge John Speed and Lucy Gilmer Speed (née Fry) on November 14, 1814. On his father's side, Speed's ancestry can be traced back to 17th-century cartographer and historian John Speed. John Speed's great-grandson (James Speed) emigrated to Virginia in 1695. James Speed's grandson, Captain James Speed, fought in the American Revolution and was seriously wounded in 1781, resulting in the Continental Congress awarding him 7,500 acres in the territory of Kentucky. He settled there in 1782 and became a judge and land speculator, eventually accumulating 45,000 acres in central Kentucky and joining the territorial conventions by which Kentucky became separated from Virginia. One of Captain Speed's six children, John Speed, owned a store in the 1790s and operated a salt works using leased slaves. In the 1800s, his father gave him a large tract on which to begin farming. He grew staples and the labor-intensive cash crop of hemp. He would acquire other businesses as well, including a blacksmith. By his death, in 1840, he had become one of Kentucky's largest slave-owners with 54.

In 1808, following the death of his first wife, John Speed married Lucy Gilmer Fry. She had come from Virginia where her family was close to Thomas Jefferson. Her father had inherited considerable wealth in land and slaves in Virginia but left for Kentucky in 1788 or 1789. There he opened a school in his home where he taught a number of boys who later became prominent. Joshua Speed was the fifth of 11 children from the marriage; one of his siblings died in infancy the year Joshua was born. Joshua remained close to his mother until her death but he seems to have had a strained relationship with his father, who complained of "all your abuse of me" when Joshua was 15. Depression seems to have run in the family with evidence in his father, two of his brothers—James Speed showed signs of clinical depression—and Joshua himself. Lincoln even observed this in Joshua, remarking, "You are 'naturally of a nervous temperament.'"

Education and clerkship
Despite having had little formal education himself, Joshua's father wanted his children to have that advantage. Joshua was tutored by his maternal grandfather, Joshua Fry, and attended St. Joseph's College near Bardstown. Before completing college, however, he fell ill. He returned home and, despite his father's opposition, argued that he was ready to begin a career. He spent two to three years as a clerk in the largest wholesale establishment in Louisville. He then moved to Springfield, Illinois.

Career
Speed decided to try his fortune in the Midwest; in 1835 he set out for Springfield, Illinois. At the time, Springfield had a population of fewer than 1,500 people. Almost immediately upon arriving there, Speed engaged in merchandising and assisted in editing a local newspaper.

Speed and Lincoln
Speed had heard young Abraham Lincoln deliver a speech on a stump when Lincoln was running for election to the Illinois legislature. On April 15, 1837, Lincoln arrived at Springfield, the new state capital, in order to seek his fortune as a young lawyer whereupon he met Joshua Speed. Lincoln sublet Joshua's apartment above Speed's store becoming his roommate, sharing a bed with him for four years, and becoming his lifelong best friend. Although bed-sharing between same sexes was a reasonably common practice in this period, it is unusual for it to have occurred over such a prolonged time. This has led to speculation regarding Lincoln's sexuality although this evidence is circumstantial.

On March 30, 1840, Judge John Speed died. Joshua announced plans to sell his store and return to his parents' large plantation house, Farmington, near Louisville, Kentucky. Lincoln, though notoriously awkward and shy around women, was then engaged to Mary Todd, a vivacious society young woman, also from Kentucky. As the dates approached for both Speed's departure and Lincoln's marriage, Lincoln broke the engagement on the planned day of the wedding, January 1, 1841. Speed departed as planned, leaving Lincoln mired in depression and guilt.

Seven months later, in July 1841, Lincoln, still depressed, decided to visit Speed in Kentucky. Speed welcomed Lincoln to his paternal house where the latter spent a month regaining his mental health. During his stay at Farmington, Lincoln rode into Louisville almost daily to discuss legal matters of the day with Attorney James Speed, Joshua's older brother. James Speed lent Lincoln books from his law library.

Joshua Speed and Lincoln disagreed over slavery, especially Speed's argument that Northerners should not care. In 1855, Lincoln wrote to Speed:

During Lincoln's presidential administration (March 4, 1861 – April 15, 1865), he offered Speed several government appointments. Speed refused each time, choosing to help in other ways. Speed disagreed with Lincoln on the slavery question but remained loyal, and coordinated Union activities in Kentucky during the American Civil War. His brother, James Speed, served as Lincoln's United States Attorney General, beginning in November 1864. In explaining the nomination to Congress, Lincoln acknowledged that he did not know James as well as he knew Joshua.

Later activities

After the assassination of Lincoln by John Wilkes Booth, Speed organized a memorial service in Louisville for the departed leader. He also pledged his support to the new President Andrew Johnson administration (April 15, 1865 to March 3, 1869). Sixty members of the Speed family gave money for a monument to honor Lincoln in Springfield. Joshua Speed also wrote lengthy letters to William Herndon, a former law partner of Lincoln who had set about to write a biography of Lincoln.

Death and legacy
Joshua Speed died on May 29, 1882, in Louisville, Kentucky. He is interred in Cave Hill Cemetery in Louisville. His family's estate, Farmington, is now listed on the National Register of Historic Places, and while the farm is substantially reduced in size, the house has been restored and has become a local event venue, and the focus of living history events.

Alleged hidden diary
In 1999, the author and gay activist Larry Kramer claimed that he had uncovered new primary sources which shed fresh light on Lincoln's sexuality. The alleged sources included a hitherto-unknown Joshua Speed diary and letters in which Speed wrote explicitly about his relationship with Lincoln. The items were supposedly discovered hidden beneath the floorboards of the old store in which the two men lived, and they were said to reside in a private collection in Davenport, Iowa. Kramer died in 2020 and apparently never produced or showed anyone the supposed documents although he published a novel in 2015, including some of his ideas about Speed and Lincoln that historian and psychoanalyst, Charles Strozier, found unconvincing as a matter of history or sexuality. The historian Gabor Boritt, referring to the alleged documents, wrote, "Almost certainly this is a hoax...."

Further family and ancestry information
Joshua Speed's father, Judge John Speed (May 17, 1772 – March 30, 1840) was born in Charlotte County, Virginia. John was first married to Abby Lemaster (d. July, 1807). They had four children, two of whom died in infancy:
Thomas Speed
Mary Speed (born 1800)
Eliza Speed (born 1805)
James Speed

John was then married to Lucy Gilmer Fry (March 23, 1788 – January 27, 1874). Lucy was born in Albemarle County, Virginia. They had eleven children:
Thomas Speed (September 15, 1809 – 1812)
Lucy Fry Speed (February 26, 1811 – 1893). Later married to James D. Breckinridge.
James Speed (March 11, 1812 – June 12, 1887)
Peachy Walker Speed (May 4, 1813 – January 18, 1881)
Joshua Fry Speed (1814–1882)
William Pope Speed (April 26, 1816 – June 28, 1863)
Susan Fry Speed (September 30, 1817 – 1888)
Major Philip Speed (April 12, 1819 – November 1, 1882)
John Smith Speed (January 1, 1821 – 1886)
Martha Bell Speed (September 8, 1822 – 1903)
Ann Pope Speed (November 5, 1831 – 1838)

Joshua Speed began a courtship with Fanny Henning (1820–1902) and married on February 15, 1842. They remained married until his death. They had no children, though they enjoyed close relationships with several of their nephews and nieces.

Fanny Henning Speed bequested a large amount to Union College in Barbourville, Kentucky, and Speed Hall, listed on the National Register, is named for her.

Joshua was a seventh generation descendant of antiquarian cartographer and historian John Speed (1552 – July 28, 1629) and his wife Susanna Draper. He was born in Farndon, Cheshire, England to an even older John Speed. His further origin is unknown. He settled in London and was a member of the Merchant Taylors' Company. His surviving maps, compiled originally in books, have been largely broken up and dispersed, as have been his writings, notably the genealogies in the King James Bible in Latin. His last will and testament mention him having twelve sons and six daughters.

He was a sixth generation descendant of an elder Dr. John Speed, MD (1595 – May 1640) and his wife Margaret Warner. John entered Merchant Taylors' School in January, 1603/1604. He became a Scholar of St John's College, Oxford in October, 1612. He received a Bachelor of Arts on May 3, 1620. He was named a Fellow of St John's College and became MD on June 20, 1628.

He was a fifth generation descendant of Dr. John Speed, M.D. (November 4, 1628 – September 21, 1711). John was born in Oxford, Oxfordshire, England. He entered Merchant Taylors' School in September, 1640. He was elected Fellow of St John's College, Oxford in June, 1644. He received a Bachelor of Arts on February 1, 1647/1648. He was expelled from the University of Oxford on May 15, 1648 and was dismissed from his Fellowship in October of the same year. He was reinstated in 1660 following the Restoration of Charles II of England to the throne. He received a master's degree on September 20, 1660 and became M.D. on June 19, 1666. He settled in Southampton around 1667. He served twice as Mayor of Southampton (1681–1682, 1693–1694).

He was a fourth generation descendant of James Bernard Speed (September 28, 1679 – March 15, 1719). James was born in Southampton, Hampshire, England and immigrated to Surry County, Virginia in 1695. On September 6, 1711, James was married to Mary Pulley (born c. 1693).

He was a great-grandson of a senior John Speed (February 5, 1714 – March 8, 1785) and his wife Mary Mintrey (c. 1706 – July 1, 1782). He was also a great-grandson of Militia Colonel John Fry (son of Joshua Fry Colonel of Virginia Militia, and commander of Lt Col George Washington, and lead survey of the Fry-Jefferson Map of Virginia, and Mary Micou Hill) and his wife Sarah Adams. Sarah was younger sister to Thomas Adams.

His paternal grandfather was Captain James Speed (March 4, 1740 – September 3, 1811), a veteran of the American Revolutionary War. His paternal grandmother was Mary Spencer (October 20, 1742 – March 5, 1829), daughter of Thomas Spencer, Sr and Elizabeth Julia Flourney. His maternal grandfather was Lieutenant Joshua Fry, another veteran of the American Revolutionary War. His namesake also represented Albemarle County in the Virginia House of Delegates from 1785 to 1786. His maternal grandmother was Peachy Walker, daughter of Dr. Thomas Walker and Mildred Thornton Meriwether of Castle Hill.

Representations in other media
Abe Lincoln in Illinois (1940) played by Minor Watson
Lincoln (1992) made-for-TV documentary voiced by Laurence Luckinbill
Abraham Lincoln, Vampire Hunter (2010), a novel by Seth Grahame-Smith, and the subsequent film adaptation (2012) played by Jimmi Simpson
The 30 Rock episode Florida (30 Rock) references the alleged relationship between Joshua Fry Speed and Abraham Lincoln.
Author Jonathan F. Putnam has written three mystery novels with Speed and Lincoln as the protagonists.
Courting Mr. Lincoln (2019). a historical novel by Louis Bayard, centering on Lincoln's relationships with Mary Todd and Joshua Speed in Springfield.
Several episodes in season two of Will & Grace (revival) feature the character Jack McFarland producing a play called “Gaybraham Twinkin’”, a story about the alleged relationship between Speed and Lincoln.

See also

List of people from the Louisville metropolitan area
Louisville in the American Civil War
Sexuality of Abraham Lincoln

References

Notes

Sources and further reading

External links
A genealogy of the Speed family since the 16th century
A genealogy of his maternal ancestors since the 17th century
The Speed Family
Lincoln 1855 letter to Joshua Speed
Mr. Lincoln and Friends: Joshua F. Speed

Historic Homes: Farmington
"Joshua and James Speed" — Article by Civil War historian/author Bryan S. Bush

1814 births
1882 deaths
American slave owners
Members of the Kentucky House of Representatives
Abraham Lincoln
Louisville, Kentucky, in the American Civil War
Politicians from Louisville, Kentucky
People of Kentucky in the American Civil War
Union (American Civil War) political leaders
Burials at Cave Hill Cemetery
Kentucky Whigs
19th-century American politicians
Southern Unionists in the American Civil War
American planters
American merchants